The Macedonian Rebellion of 1854 was a Greek rebellion which took place in 1854 and is divided into two phases: the first phase took place in Western and Southern Macedonia and the second in Chalkidiki. However, after pressure from the United Kingdom and France on the government of King Otto of Greece, he was forced to recall the chieftains taking part in the rebellions throughout the Greek-inhabited regions of the Ottoman Empire, including Macedonia. The governments of the United Kingdom and France had assumed that the rebellions were related to the Crimean War (1853–1856).

In Southern Macedonia, the chieftains of Mount Olympos and fighters from independent Greece and Thessaly and Magnesia captured the Vale of Tempe and some parts of Pieria. In Western Macedonia, the revolutionaries led by Theodoros Ziakas took control of the western Pindus and attacked the area of Grevena, but the numerical superiority of the Ottoman army and the hostile stance of the United Kingdom and France resulted in the signing of an armistice and the return of the chieftains to Greece on June 1854.

The second phase took place in Chalkidiki and it was led by Tsamis Karatasos, former adjutant of King Otto. Karatasos had disembarked in Sithonia in April 1854, but he confronted the French forces which continuously fired on him, as they were afraid of his possible entrance into Thessaloniki. After a brief capture of Karyes in Mount Athos, whose monks hadn't supported the rebellion, Karatasos had to return to Greece on a French naval ship. The consuls of the United Kingdom and France took over the protection of the non-combatants and of the fighters who had supported Karatasos from a possible Ottoman invasion of Mount Athos.

Sources 
 The revolutionary movement of 1854, Institute of the Museum of Macedonian Struggle
 The irredentist rebellions of 1854 in mainland Greece, Foundation of the Hellenic World

History of Macedonia (Greece)
Conflicts in 1854
19th-century rebellions
Macedonia under the Ottoman Empire
Greece–Ottoman Empire relations
Macedonia 1854
1854 in Greece
History of Greece (1832–1862)
1854 in the Ottoman Empire
Crimean War